The Fildwith Ensemble Theatre was a not-for-profit company in New York City, established in 2005, following thirteen years at its associate summer theatre company in the Adirondack Mountains Boquet River Theatre Festival.

The company's purpose is to provide a supportive "creative home" for its actors, playwrights, composers, directors and choreographers.  The Fildwith encourages artists  to keep their expressive spirits actively engaged between or after other professional jobs.

Its creative artists collaborate on productions of new plays and original musicals that celebrate the resilient human spirit and the elevating power of generosity, compassion and kindness in this world.

The company supports and promotes the talents of children, teens and adults in providing theatrical opportunities for both established and emerging young professional artists in Off-Broadway venues.

Non-profit organizations based in New York City
Performing groups established in 2005
2005 establishments in New York City